Foodshed.io is an agricultural technology company that specializes in local food supply chains. They partner with restaurants, universities, and grocery store retailers to source local produce and other food products.

History 
Foodshed.io was founded in 2016 by Daniel Beckmann PhD, Clare Sullivan, and Thomas Hallaran. The company operates in the Midwestern United States, and in 2019 joined the St. Louis Yield Lab incubator. 

In 2020, they partnered with St. Louis based grocery store chain Schnucks Markets. By September 2021, the Schnucks local produce program grew by 173% over one year by utilizing the Foodshed.io platform.

Foodshed was a member of Chipotle Mexican Grill's 2021 "Aluminaries project".

Services

Technology 
Foodshed.io has an application that is available for mobile or web. The platform allows farmers to list produce and other goods for buyers within a 250 mile radius. The local inventory is aggregated from a network of local farms to create a market where buyers can place all of their orders. It is currently in use at Schnucks markets.

Food Safety 
For retail institutions requiring a USDA GAP Certification, Foodshed.io prepares farmers to become certified.

Environmental Impact 
The company works with local growers to help minimize the environmental impact of their farming. This includes crop rotation and topsoil preservation, as well as reducing food waste and food miles.

References 

American food and drink organizations
Supply chain software companies